The Missouri National Guard (MONG), commonly known as the Missouri Guard, is a component of the Army National Guard and Missouri State Department of the National Guard. It is composed of Army and Air National Guard units. The Department office is located in Jefferson City.  

The Mission of the Missouri National Guard is "to provide trained and disciplined forces for domestic emergencies or as otherwise required by state law under the authority of the governor."

History

The Missouri National Guard traces its origins to the Missouri State Militia, which was federally funded state militia conceived in 1861 and called to service in 1862 during the Civil War. It was a force designed to protect Missouri from Confederate guerillas.

The Missouri Army National Guard was formed in 1877. It was first mobilized en-masse during the Spanish–American War in 1898. During the war, it was split into six volunteer infantry regiments. The 1st Missouri Infantry Regiment was commanded by Col. Edwin Batdorf, the 2nd Missouri Infantry Regiment was commanded by Col. William K. Caffee, the 3rd Missouri Infantry Regiment commanded by Col. George P. Gross, the 4th Missouri Infantry Regiment commanded by Col. Joseph A. Corby, the 5th Missouri Infantry Regiment commanded by Col. Milton Moore, and the 6th Missouri Infantry Regiment commanded by Col. Letcher H. Hardeman.

The Missouri Air National Guard was established following World War II, in 1947. The Air Guard was first mobilized en masse during the Korean War. 

For much of the final decades of the twentieth century, National Guard personnel typically served "One weekend a month, two weeks a year", with a portion working for the Guard in a full-time capacity. The current forces formation plans of the US Army call for the typical National Guard unit (or National Guardsman) to serve one year of active duty for every three years of service. More specifically, current United States Department of Defense policy is that no Guardsman will be involuntarily activated for a total of more than 24 months (cumulative) in one six-year enlistment period (this policy is due to change 1 August 2007, the new policy states that soldiers will be given 24 months between deployments of no more than 24 months, individual states have differing policies).

In December 1989, a contingent of 22 Military Policemen from the 1138th Military Police Company was in Panama on a two-week annual training when "Operation Just Cause" commenced. The MPs, who specialized in enemy prisoner of war operations, augmented the active duty force at Fort Clayton, taking enemy mortar and artillery fire when the invasion began. While serving in combat, the unit set up and operated the Empire Range EPW camp. The Missouri National Guard was the first National Guard unit to be called into active service since the end of Vietnam.

The 1138th was called upon once again to serve after the Invasion of Kuwait the following year. It was one of the first Guard units placed on alert status in August, 1990 but did not deploy until December, 1990. The Missouri Guard was the first Enemy Prisoner of War (EPW) unit to deploy as part of the 400th MP Battalion. Eventually it set up and operated the 301st EPW Camp, near the Saudi Arabian city of Hafar al-Batin (Hotel 301). It returned to West Plains, Missouri in May 1991 with a hero's welcome.

In 2012, Missouri organized the Missouri State Defense Force to serve as Missouri's official state defense force and to augment the Missouri National Guard during stateside missions. The Missouri State Defense Force was disbanded in 2022.

On August 18, 2014, after violent clashes occurred during an imposed curfew in Ferguson, Missouri in the aftermath of the fatal police shooting of a resident of Ferguson, Missouri Governor Jay Nixon issued an executive order calling in the National Guard to "help restore peace and order and to protect the citizens of Ferguson."

In January of 2017 the 110th Maneuver Enhancement Brigade was deployed in support of Operation Spartan Shield and Operation Inherent Resolve in Qatar.

In January of 2021, Governor Mike Parson activated the Missouri National Guard to help administer  COVID-19 vaccinations.

In June of 2022, the 1138th Engineer Company (Sapper) participated in Exercise African Lion in Morocco as part of US Africa Command.

On November 8th, 2022, Amendment 5 was approved by Missouri voters which separated the Missouri National Guard from the Department of Public Safety into its own department, the Missouri Department of the National Guard. The amendment was placed on the ballot by the Missouri Legislature after being introduced in the Missouri House of Representatives by Representative Adam Schnelting.

Organization

The Missouri Army National Guard is authorized more than 11,500 soldiers and airman, Subordinate units within the Missouri National Guard include: 

Missouri Army National Guard 

 Joint Forces Headquarters-Missouri (Jefferson City)
 110th Maneuver Enhancement Brigade (Kansas City)
 1st Battalion, 138th Infantry Regiment (Assigned to the 39th IBCT ARARNG)
 3rd Battalion, 138th Infantry Regiment (Assigned to the 72nd IBCT TXARNG)
 1st Battalion, 129th Field Artillery Regiment
 220th Transportation Battalion
 135th Signal Company
 35th Infantry Division (Lexington)
 35th Combat Aviation Brigade (Sedalia)
 1st Battalion, 135th Aviation Regiment (Assault)
 935th Aviation Support Battalion

 35th Military Police Brigade (Jefferson Barracks)
 175th Military Police Battalion 
 205th Military Police Battalion
 235th Engineer Team
 35th Engineer Brigade (Fort Leonard Wood)
 203rd Engineer Battalion
 1140th Engineer Battalion
 635th Forward Engineer Support Team - Main (FEST-M)
 1107th Theater Aviation Support Maintenance Group (Springfield)
 70th Troop Command
 7th Civil Support Team
 135th Army Band
 70th Mobile Public Affairs Detachment
 135th Military History Detachment
 Detachment 1, 179th Cyber Protection Team
 229th Multifunctional Medical Battalion
 835th Combat Sustainment Brigade
 Missouri Army National Guard Support Elements
 Missouri Army National Guard Recruiter and Retention
 140th Regional Training Institute
 Missouri Army National Guard Training Center
 Missouri Medical Detachment

Missouri Air National Guard

 131st Bomb Wing (Whiteman AFB / Jefferson Barracks Air Guard Station)
 131st Medical Group
 131st Operations Group
 131st Mission Support Group
 131st Maintenance Group
 157th Air Operations Group
 131st Bomb Wing Staff
 139th Airlift Wing (Rosecrans Air National Guard Base)
 139th Operations Group
 139th Mission Support Group
 139th Maintenance Group
 139th Medical Group
 Advanced Airlift Tactics Training Center
 139th Airlift Wing Staff

Source: Missouri Army National Guard 2021 Annual Report & MONG organization

Decorations of the Missouri National Guard 
Missouri National Guard State Awards:

  Missouri Meritorious Service Medal
  Missouri Conspicuous Service Medal
  Missouri Commendation Ribbon
  Missouri Desert Storm Ribbon
  Missouri 20 Year Long Service Ribbon
  Missouri 15 Year Long Service Ribbon
  Missouri 10 Year Long Service Ribbon
  Missouri 5 Year Long Service Ribbon
  Missouri First Sergeant Ribbon
  Missouri Expeditionary Ribbon
  Missouri State Emergency Duty Ribbon
  Missouri Panamanian Service Ribbon
  Missouri Afghanistan Campaign Ribbon
  Missouri Kosovo Campaign Ribbon
  Missouri Recruiting and Retention Ribbon
  Missouri Adjutant General's Twenty Ribbon
  Missouri Governor's Twelve Ribbon
  Missouri Basic Training Ribbon
  Governor's Unit Citation

References

Bibliography

External links

 
 
 

1808 establishments in the United States
Military in Missouri
Military units and formations established in 1808
National Guard (United States)
Organizations based in Jefferson City, Missouri
State law enforcement agencies of Missouri